Stars & Stripes or Stars and Stripes may refer to:

United States
 Flag of the United States, nickname Stars and Stripes
 United States men's national soccer team, also nicknamed Stars and Stripes
 United States women's national soccer team, also nicknamed Stars and Stripes

Military
 Stars and Stripes (newspaper), government-supported newspaper of the United States Armed Forces
 USS Stars and Stripes (1861)

Arts and entertainment
 Stars and Stripes trilogy, a collection of three alternate history novels by Harry Harrison
 Stars and Stripes (ballet), choreographed by George Balanchine in 1958
 Stars and Stripes (professional wrestling), a World Championship wrestling tag team

Music
 Stars & Stripes (album), 2002 album by Aaron Tippin
 Stars & Stripes (EP), a 2008 EP by SOJA
 Stars and Stripes Vol. 1, 1996 album by The Beach Boys 
 "Stars 'n' Stripes", a song by Grant Lee Buffalo from Fuzzy
 Stars and Stripes, American Oi! band and side project of Jack Kelly from Slapshot

Other uses
 Stars & Stripes (soft drink)
 Stars & Stripes (America's Cup syndicate), a series of America's Cup competitors
 Stars and Stripes Stakes an American Thoroughbred horse race at Arlington Park

See also
 Stars and Stripes Forever (disambiguation)